John Fleming FRSE FRS FSA (10 January 1785 – 18 November 1857) was a Scottish Free Church minister, naturalist, zoologist and geologist. He named and described a number of species of molluscs. During his life he tried to reconcile theology with science.

Fleming Fjord in Greenland was named after him.

Life

He was born on Kirkroads Farm near Bathgate in Linlithgowshire, the son of Alexander Fleming and his wife Catherine Nimmo.

After studying divinity at the University of Edinburgh he graduated in 1805. He was licensed to preach by the Church of Scotland and ordained as minister of Bressay in the Shetland Islands in 1808.  In 1810 he translated to the parish of Flisk in Fife and in 1832 translated to Clackmannan.

In 1808, he participated in founding the Wernerian Society, a learned society devoted to the study of natural history.

John Fleming became a Member of the Royal Society of London on 25 February 1813 (he was not granted Fellowship). In 1814, he was awarded an honorary doctorate (Doctor of Divinity) by the University of St. Andrews and in the same year he became a fellow of the Royal Society of Edinburgh. His proposers for the latter were John Playfair, David Brewster and Robert Jameson.

He was awarded the chair of natural philosophy (Physics) at the University of Aberdeen's King's College in 1834. In the Disruption of 1843 he left the established Church of Scotland to join the Free Church. In 1845, he became professor of natural history at the Free Church's New College in Edinburgh. He was three times elected President of the Edinburgh Botanical Society (1847–48, 1849–50 and 1856–57). He was then living at 22 Walker Street in Edinburgh's West End.

He died at home, Seagrove House in Leith and is buried with his family in the western half of Dean Cemetery in Edinburgh. He is buried with his wife, Melville Christie (1796–1862) and son Dr Andrew Fleming (1821–1901) (also a Fellow of the Royal Society of Edinburgh) who rose to be Depute Surgeon General of the Indian Army.

Works
Fleming was a vitalist who was strongly opposed to materialism. He believed that a 'vital principle' was inherent in the embryo with the capacity of "developing in succession the destined plan of existence." He was a close associate of Robert Edmond Grant, who considered that the same laws of life affected all organisms. 

In 1824, Fleming became involved in a famous controversy with the geologist William Buckland (1784–1856) about the nature of The Flood as described in the Bible. In 1828, he published his History of British Animals. This book addressed not only extant, but also fossil species. It explained the presence of fossils by climate change, suggesting that extinct species would have survived if weather conditions had been favorable. These theories contributed to the advancement of biogeography, and exerted some influence on Charles Darwin (1809–1882). Flemings' comments on instinct in his book Philosophy of Zoology had influenced Darwin.

In 1831, Fleming found some fossils which he recognized as fish in the Old Red Sandstone units at Fife. This did not fit the generally accepted notion that the Earth was approximately 6,000 years old.

Partial list of publications 
 1821: Insecta in Supplement to the fourth, fifth and sixth editions of the Encyclopae-dia Britannica, with preliminary dissertations on the history of the sciences
 1822: Philosophy of Zoology (Volume 1, Volume 2)
 1828: A History of British animals, exhibiting the descriptive characters and systematical arrangement of the genera and species of quadrupeds, birds, reptiles, fishes, mollusca, and radiata of the United Kingdom, including the indigenous, extirpated , and extinct kinds, together with periodical and occasional visitants Edinburgh: i–xxiii + 1–565.
1837: Molluscous Animals
 1851: The Temperature of the Seasons, and Its Influence on Inorganic Objects, and on Plants and Animals

Partial list of described taxa 
 Superfamily: Conoidea Fleming, 1822
 Family: Conidae Fleming, 1822
 Subfamily: Coninae Fleming, 1822
Species in the phylum Mollusca described by Fleming:

 Chiton laevigatus Fleming 1813 
 Patella elongata Fleming 1813  
 Patella elliptica Fleming 1813 
 Doris nigricans Fleming 1820 
 Heterofusus retroversus Fleming 1823
 Octopus octopodia (Linné 1758 : Sepia) Fleming, 1826
 Bulla cranchii Fleming 1828  
 Eolidia plumosa Fleming 1828 
 Modiola vulgaris Fleming 1828  
 Lima fragilis Gmelin 1791 sensu Fleming, 1828
 Lutraria vulgaris Fleming 1828  
 Gastrochaena hians Fleming 1828 
 Patella clealandi Fleming 1828 
 Assiminea grayana Fleming 1828
 Scissurella crispata Fleming 1828

References

External links
 Brief biography/timeline

Scottish zoologists
Scottish entomologists
Scottish geologists
1785 births
1857 deaths
Fellows of the Royal Society
Fellows of the Royal Society of Edinburgh
19th-century Ministers of the Church of Scotland
People from West Lothian
Alumni of the University of Edinburgh
Alumni of the University of St Andrews
19th-century British geologists
19th-century British zoologists
Vitalists